In most patent laws, unity of invention is a formal administrative requirement that must be met by a patent application to become a granted patent. Basically, a patent application can relate only to one invention or a group of closely related inventions. The purpose of this requirement is administrative, as well as financial. That is, the requirement serves to preclude the option of filing one patent application for several inventions, while paying only one set of fees (filing fee, search fee, examination fee, renewal fees, and so on). Unity of invention also makes the classification of patent documents easier.

When a patent application is objected to on the ground of a lack of unity, it may be still considered for patent protection, unlike in the case where the invention is found to be lacking novelty. A divisional application can usually be filed for the second invention, and for the further inventions, if any.  Alternatively, a patent prosecutor may make a technical argument that there is unity of invention.

Jurisdictions

European Patent Convention 

Under European patent practice and case law, lack of unity (of invention) can appear either "a priori", before the prior art was examined, or "a posteriori", after the prior art was examined. An a posteriori lack of unity usually results from a lack of novelty or inventive step of the subject-matter of one independent claim.

Patent Cooperation Treaty 
Under the Patent Cooperation Treaty (PCT), an international application, which is also called PCT application, "shall relate to one invention only or to a group of inventions so linked as to form a single general inventive concept". If the requirement of unity of invention is not met, the International Searching Authority (i.e., the patent office in charge of carrying out the international search) "is entitled to request the applicant to pay an additional search fee for each invention beyond the first which is to be searched".

In reaction to such a request from the International Searching Authority (ISA), the applicant may pay all or some of the requested additional search fees, and the International Searching Authority (ISA) then establishes the international search for all or some of the inventions or groups of inventions, respectively. The applicant may also decide not to pay any of the additional search fees, and, in such case, the ISA does not carry out a search for the inventions or groups of inventions for which no search fees have been paid. The international search report (ISR) is then established only for the first claimed invention.

If the applicant disagrees with the ISA’s finding of lack of unity of invention, the additional fees may be paid under protest. In the protest procedure, the applicant files a reasoned statement explaining why it considers that the requirement of unity of invention has been complied with, or that the number of additional fees required is excessive. After payment of the additional search fees and, if required, of a protest fee, the protest is examined by a review body. If the review body finds the protest justified, it orders the total or partial reimbursement of the additional search fees, and, if applicable, the protest fee, to the applicant. When, for instance, the European Patent Office acts as ISA, the review body in charge of examining the protest consists of three members: "the head of a directorate, normally the head of the directorate by which the invitation to pay additional fees was issued, an examiner with special expertise in unity of invention and, normally, the examiner who issued the invitation."

United States 
Although U.S. patent law does not use the term "unity of invention", 35 U.S.C. §121 specifies the conditions under which the patent examiner may issue a "restriction requirement", i.e. requesting a split: "applications that claim more than one distinct invention may be subject to restriction to a single invention, and the applicant may prosecute the remaining invention(s) by filing divisional applications." The applicant would have to pay to filing, examination, issuance and maintenance of each divisional separately.

The term "distinct inventions" means here that related concepts (such as apparatus for charging the disclosed battery, an apparatus for getting electric power from the battery, a material to make an electrode for the battery) would be considered "distinct inventions" if they can be used not only in a combination with each other. An examplary language of restriction requirement is:

The examiner noted that Inventions I and II are related as a method and apparatus for its practice, respectively. The examiner further noted that Invention I and Invention II are distinct, if either
The method (Invention II) as claimed can be practiced by another and materially different apparatus or by hand, or
The apparatus (Invention I) as claimed can be used to practice another and materially different method.

A judicial appeal is not available for "restriction requirements". It is also advised that inventors/applicants do not split their applications themselves, but rather always wait for an examiner to issue a "restriction". Otherwise, the applicant can be accused of double patenting later, and have his patents revoked. 

The USPTO approach to "unity of invention" is different from the EPO's approach.  Whereas the EPO would consider claim as relating to the same invention, if the claims have a common inventive step, the USPTO approach is based instead on the field of use / purpose of the invention. This difference results in a multi-fold larger number of divisional US patents being issued compared to UK, German or French patents that originate from the same Paris Convention or PCT priority application.

References

External links 
 European Patent Convention (EPC)
 
 
 Patent Cooperation Treaty (PCT)
 : Unity of Invention
 : Lack of Unity of Invention (International Search)
 : Lack of Unity of Invention (International Preliminary Examination)
 Title 35 of the United States Code (35 U.S.C.)
 35 U.S.C. §121: Divisional applications

Patent law